Avis Red Bear (née Avis Little Eagle) is a journalist and the founder of the Teton Times, an independent Native American newspaper. She is a member of the Standing Rock Sioux tribe.

Biography
Little Eagle began work as a journalist at the Lakota Times in 1990. There, she wrote a ten-part series exposing fake medicine men and women which Tim Giago, editor of the Lakota Times, calls "one of the major accomplishments in Indian journalism." Over the next decade at the Lakota Times, she was promoted from news reporter to managing editor. When the paper changed its name to Indian Country Today, Little Eagle was the one who suggested the new name.

In 2002, Little Eagle founded the Teton Times in McLaughlin, South Dakota. The newspaper only exists in print, without a website. The paper serves the Standing Rock Reservation, where Little Eagle says many of her customers don't have internet access, so that, she says, "her printed paper is the only way they know what's going on with local government or whose kids made the honor roll." Unlike many Native newspapers, the Teton Times is independent, rather than being owned by the tribal government of the area it serves. Tim Giago identifies the Teton Times as one of the "most read, most influential of these independent newspapers." In the report American Indian Media Today, Jodi Rave emphasizes the importance of independent ownership: "Press freedom for tribe-owned media is a key challenge faced by Native American media. Tribal governments remain the largest media owners and control an estimated 72 percent of newspapers and radio stations."

In 2005, Little Eagle ran for office within the Standing Rock Sioux Tribe, and became the first woman elected to be vice president. When President Barack Obama visited Standing Rock in 2014, Little Eagle expressed concerns about the proposed expansion Keystone Pipeline which would impact her tribe's land, and was present at the Pow Wow held in his honor at Cannon Ball, North Dakota. As of 2015, she was a councilwoman at-large for Standing Rock.

She was elected to the board of the Native American Journalists Association in 2019.

Awards and nominations
 Little Eagle was nominated for the Spirit of Dakota Award in 2017.

References 

Living people
American newspaper journalists
American women journalists
Year of birth missing (living people)
21st-century American women
Native American journalists
21st-century Native American women
21st-century Native Americans
Standing Rock Sioux people